San José is a province of Costa Rica. It is located in the central part of the country, and borders (clockwise beginning in the north) the provinces of Alajuela, Heredia, Limón, Cartago and Puntarenas. The provincial and national capital is San José. The province covers an area of 4,965.9 km². and has a population of 1,404,242.

Subdivisions
The province of San José is subdivided into 20 cantons.

Canton (Capital):
 San José (San José)
 Escazú (Escazú)
 Desamparados (Desamparados)
 Puriscal (Santiago)
 Tarrazú (San Marcos)
 Aserrí (Aserrí)
 Mora (Ciudad Colón)
 Goicoechea (Guadalupe)
 Santa Ana (Santa Ana)
 Alajuelita (Alajuelita)
 Vázquez de Coronado (San Isidro)
 Acosta (San Ignacio)
 Tibás (San Juan)
 Moravia (San Vicente)
 Montes de Oca (San Pedro)
 Turrubares (San Pablo)
 Dota (Santa María)
 Curridabat (Curridabat)
 Pérez Zeledón (San Isidro de El General)
 León Cortés Castro (San Pablo)

See also
Provinces of Costa Rica
Greater Metropolitan Area.

References

External links

 
Provinces of Costa Rica